Student Sponsor Partners is a non-profit organization based in New York City founded by Peter Flanigan in 1986.  Student Sponsor Partners (SSP) gives students in underserved communities across New York City the opportunity to receive a quality private high school education, one-on-one mentorship, and college and career programming.

History

During the winter of 1986, a conversation took place between two bankers on how to help inner-city kids. They decided to try giving these young people scholarships to private schools and mentor these kids throughout their high school careers. The conversation caught wind among some thoughtful individuals. By the following September, 45 sponsors were supporting 45 students at Cardinal Hayes High School and Cathedral High School. Since then, thousands of SSP students have graduated from one of the program's 23 partner high schools across the city.

For more than 30 years, SSP has addressed the high school dropout crisis in New York City by providing students with four years of college-preparatory education and mentorship. All SSP students are paired with sponsors and mentors who offer financial support and one-on-one mentorship, thus making a meaningful impact on their lives while guiding them through their high school careers.

Program Description

The SSP program is composed of three key groups: students (about 1,200 per year), sponsors and mentors, and partner high schools (23). SSP students are selected according to their financial, academic, and social needs. SSP students typically have a family per-capita annual income of less than $10,000, score average or below-average on middle-school reading and/or math standardized tests, and live with a single parent or guardian.

SSP sponsors and mentors are educated professionals who make a four-year commitment to support a student. Mentors become role models for their students and help guide them academically.
 
SSP partner schools maintain a structured and nurturing learning environment, and they have a long history of educating New York City students. Each school assigns a dedicated coordinator to monitor and support the progress of SSP students and maintain regular contact with SSP families, mentors, and program staff. 
SSP's 23 participating schools are located in Brooklyn, Queens, Manhattan, the Bronx, and Staten Island. Most of SSP's schools are Catholic schools.

Statistics

Statistics show that:
 About 85 percent of students in the program graduate high school on time. This exceeds the graduation rate of their peers at New York City public schools.
 Ninety-two percent of students attend college, receiving about $25 million in financial aid, grants, and scholarships annually.
 Throughout Student Sponsor Partners' history, students have been the recipients of the New York Times Scholarship, the Gates Millennium Scholar, and the POSSE Foundation Scholarship.

Participating schools 
The following schools are part of Student Sponsor Partners as of January 2022:
 Academy of Mount St. Ursula (Girls)
 All Hallows High School (Boys)
 Bishop Loughlin Memorial High School (Co-Ed)
 Cardinal Hayes High School (Boys)
 Cathedral High School (Girls)
 Christ the King Regional High School (Co-Ed)
 Cristo Rey New York High School (Co-Ed)
 Cristo Rey Brooklyn High School (Co-Ed)
 La Salle Academy (Boys)
 Holy Cross High School (Co-Ed)
 Martin Luther School (Co-Ed)
 The Mary Louis Academy (Girls)
 Monsignor McClancy Memorial High School (Co-Ed)
 Monsignor Scanlan High School (Co-Ed)
 Moore Catholic High School (Co-Ed)
 Mount Saint Michael Academy (Boys)
 Nazareth Regional High School (Co-Ed)
 Preston High School (Girls)
 Saint Barnabas High School (Girls)
 St. Francis Preparatory School (Co-Ed)
 St. Jean Baptiste High School (Girls)
 St. Raymond Academy (Girls)
 St. Raymond High School for Boys

Milestones

Notable donors

The Flanigan Society
Diocese of Brooklyn
Carson Family Charitable Trust
The Clark Foundation
Dee and Kevin Conway
Credit Suisse Americas Foundation
Credit Suisse Fixed Income Division
David J. And Marilyn B. Dunn
Peter M. Flanigan
Goldman, Sachs & Co.
The Kovner Foundation
Kate and Robert Niehaus
Partnership for Inner-city Education
Valerie and Jack Rowe
Peter Jay Sharp Foundation
William E. Simon Foundation
Tiger Foundation

Members of The Flanigan Society have donated more than $1 million over the course of 25 years.

References

Education in New York City
Non-profit organizations based in New York City
1986 establishments in New York City